Donald Joseph Cotrona (born May 23, 1980) is an American actor, known for his role in the film G.I. Joe: Retaliation (2013) and as Seth Gecko in the El Rey Network horror television series From Dusk till Dawn.

Early life
Cotrona was born in New Haven, Connecticut. His mother, Sheree, is a teacher, and his father, Donald, works for a recycling company. Cotrona has partial Italian ancestry. He was studying to be a lawyer at Northeastern University in Boston; however, after doing a summer internship at a law firm, he realized he did not like working with lawyers. In his sophomore year, he switched to acting; during his spring break, he went to visit a friend in Los Angeles and never returned to college.

Career
After a few guest starring roles, Cotrona was being considered for the role of Ryan Atwood on the television series The O.C. but that role went to Benjamin McKenzie. Shortly thereafter Cotrona was cast as the male lead in another of Fox's new dramas of 2003, the Jerry Bruckheimer produced Skin. Cotrona played Adam Roam, the son of the Los Angeles District Attorney. His character becomes involved with Jewel Goldman (Olivia Wilde), whose father runs a pornography company. With their fathers' feud looming over them they pursue their "Romeo and Juliet" relationship. Skin was cancelled after three episodes aired due to poor ratings and the controversial story lines. The eight episodes of the series were shown on SOAPnet in 2005.

Cotrona appeared in the 2005 horror film Venom, which was directed by Jim Gillespie. He also starred in the 2006 Slamdance Film Festival film Love is the Drug.

In 2005, Cotrona again landed a lead role in a TV series, playing Sean Mathers, a flower shop worker with a dark past who is part of a group of lottery winners, in the NBC series Windfall. The series would end up being shown in the summer of 2006 rather than as a mid-season replacement for the 2005-06 TV season.

Cotrona was cast in the role of Superman for Warner Bros.' planned film Justice League: Mortal; however, after issues resulting from the 2007–2008 Writers Guild of America strike and other production concerns, the film was cancelled.

In 2010, Cotrona appeared in the film Dear John. In February he was cast as Detective John Stone in the ABC pilot 187 Detroit, which also stars Michael Imperioli, Shaun Majumder, and Erin Cummings among others. When ABC ordered the series it was renamed Detroit 1-8-7.  His character was killed in "Stone Cold", the sixteenth episode of the series. Cotrona played Flint, one of the leading roles, in the sequel G.I. Joe: Retaliation (2013).

In March 2014, the horror television series From Dusk till Dawn developed by Robert Rodriguez based on his own cult horror film of the same title, was aired on the newly launched El Rey Network. Cotrona played Seth Gecko in the series, being part of the main cast until the series ended in 2016.

He has since appeared in the promotional 30-minute short film for Tom Clancy's Ghost Recon Wildlands, which aired in February 2017.

Filmography

Film

Television

References

External links 

 

1980 births
Living people
Northeastern University alumni
People from Wallingford, Connecticut
Male actors from New Haven, Connecticut
21st-century American male actors
American male film actors
American male television actors